Dodawad  is a southern state of Karnataka, India. It is located in the Bailhongal taluk of Belgaum district in Karnataka.

Demographics
At the 2001 India census, Dodawad had a population of 8516 with 4426 males and 4090 females.

See also
 Belgaum
 Districts of Karnataka

References

External links
 http://Belgaum.nic.in/

Villages in Belagavi district